Mark J. Carron (born July 8, 1962, in Springfield, Massachusetts) is an American politician who represented the 6th Worcester District in the Massachusetts House of Representatives from 1999 to 2007 and was a member of the Southbridge, Massachusetts Town Council from 1996 to 1999.

In 2012, Carron was ordered to serve 6 months of a 2-year jail sentence for driving while under the influence of alcohol. Carron had previously been convicted of drunken driving in 1987 and 1991.

References

1962 births
Democratic Party members of the Massachusetts House of Representatives
People from Southbridge, Massachusetts
Springfield College (Massachusetts) alumni
Worcester State University alumni
Living people